The 2007–08 season was AS Monaco FC's 51st season in Ligue 1. They finished twelfth in Ligue 1, and were knocked out of the Coupe de la Ligue by Lens, at the Round of 16, and the Coupe de France by Marseille at the Round of 32.

Ricardo Gomes was appointed as coach at the beginning of the season, replacing Laurent Banide.

Squad

Out on loan

Transfers

Summer

In:

Out:

Winter

In:

Out:

Competitions

Ligue 1

League table

Results summary

Results by round

Results

Coupe de la Ligue

Coupe de France

Statistics

Appearances and Goals
 

|-
|colspan="14"|Players away from the club on loan:

|-
|colspan="14"|Players who appeared for Monaco no longer at the club:

|}

Goal scorers

Disciplinary Record

References

Monaco
AS Monaco FC seasons
AS Monaco
AS Monaco